Hermann Mandel (13 December 1882 – 8 April 1946), born Johann Hermann Mandel, was a German theologian who served as Professor of Theology at the University of Kiel

Biography
Hermann Mandel was born in Holzwickede, Germany on 13 December 1882. His father, Heinrich Mandel, was a teacher and later the head of an orphanage. At Greifswald his teacher was Carl Stange. Mandel received his Ph.D. and completed his habilitation at Greifswald, and in 1911 he was appointed a professor there. 

From 1912 to 1918, Mandel was Professor of Systematic Theology at the University of Rostock. From 1918 to 1935 he was Professor of Theology at the University of Kiel, having succeeded Erich Schaeder. During this years, Mandel increasingly drifted away from traditional Protestant teaching, and became interested in the relationship between religion and race and ethnicity. He saw the intellectual world as being divided into Western and Near Eastern components, and argued in favor of purging Christianity of all Jewish influences. He joined Jakob Wilhelm Hauer's German Faith Movement and became a co-editor of its journal Deutscher Glaube. Mandel authored a number of works on the supposed religions of the "Nordic" and "Aryan" races, Christianity, and Indo-European religion. Many of these works were banned and destroyed in the Soviet occupation zone after the war. 

Mandel died in Kluvensiek, Rendsburg, Germany on 8 April 1946.

See also
 Otto Huth
 Gustav Mensching

Selected works
 Die Erkenntnis des Übersinnlichen: Grundriß der systematischen Theologie. Leipzig: Deichert 1911–1912.
 Nordisch-Deutsches Seelentum im Gegensatz zum Morgenländischen. Stuttgart 1934.
 Nordisch-arische Wirklichkeitsreligion. 1934.
 Deutsche Glaubensunterweisung in Frage und Antwort. 1935.
 Deutscher Gottglaube. 1934.
 Rassenkundliche Geistesgeschichte. Eine einführende Antrittsvorlesung und ein systematischer Forschungsüberblick. Leipzig 1936 (Schriften zum deutschen Glauben. Heft 6).
Das Wesen des Judentums nach Selbstzeugnis und Kulturleistung. Die Judenfrage im Licht der Rassenpsychologie und Kulturbiologie. In: Der Weltkampf, 1942, S. 189–199.

Sources

 
 Antje Gerlach: Mandel, Hermann. In: Wolfgang Benz (Hrsg.): Handbuch des Antisemitismus. Judenfeindschaft in Geschichte und Gegenwart. Bd. 2/2: Personen L–Z. De Gruyter Saur, Berlin 2009, S. 512f.

1882 births
1946 deaths
Academic staff of the University of Rostock
German theologians
Indo-Europeanists
University of Greifswald alumni
Academic staff of the University of Greifswald
Academic staff of the University of Kiel